Ciudad Ojeda is a city located in the northeastern shore of Lake Maracaibo in Zulia State in northwestern Venezuela. Its population as of the 2005 census was listed as 128,941.

History

Ciudad Ojeda was founded on January 19, 1937, by former president Eleazar López Contreras as a settlement for the inhabitants of Lagunillas de Aguas Today, it is a major center for the oil and gas industry in the Lake Maracaibo region.

On November 13, 1939, a terrible fire destroyed Lagunillas de Agua, causing over 200 fatalities. There are several hypotheses about the cause of the fire that prompted the final and decisive transfer of population to the mainland. The truth is that the oil industry was an oily layer on the lake, which had the potential to ignite the wooden houses built on stilts in the lake. One hypothesis is the accidental fall of a kerosene lamp to the lake from the Bar Caracas. Another is a fire caused by an oil company when he was going to beat his concession, that company helped reconstruction and retained the award after all, there is no evidence of this fact.

Origin of the name
Ciudad Ojeda was named in honor of Alonso de Ojeda, the Spaniard who was the first European to discover Lake Maracaibo.

Population
Ciudad Ojeda is medium-sized among Venezuelan cities, with a population of approximately 130,000 inhabitants. The majority of Citojenses are of Venezuelan origin. It is also home to numerous foreign communities of Italian, Portuguese, Chinese and Arabs who have the biggest commercial businesses in the city.

Places of interest
 (Church of Santa Lucia) 
 (House of Culture)
 (Containment Wall of the Lago de Maracaibo)
 (Alonso de Ojeda Square)
 (Simón Bolívar Square)
 (The Biggest Mural)

Colleges and universities
Universidad Alonso de Ojeda - (Uniojeda)
Universidad Nacional Experimental Rafael María Baralt - (UNERMB)
Instituto Universitario Pedro Emilio Coll - (IUTPEC)

Notable people
 Denyse Floreano – Miss Venezuela 1994
 Eddie Pérez – former Major League Baseball player and currently a catching coach for the Atlanta Braves
 Mariángel Villasmil – Miss Venezuela 2020

References

Cities in Zulia
Populated places established in 1937